The M4 corridor is an area in the United Kingdom adjacent to the M4 motorway, which runs from London to South Wales. It is a major high-technology hub. Important cities and towns linked by the M4 include (from east to west) London, Slough, Bracknell, Maidenhead, Reading, Newbury, Swindon, Bath, Bristol, Newport, Cardiff, Port Talbot and Swansea. The area is also served by the Great Western Main Line, the South Wales Main Line, and London Heathrow Airport. Technology companies with major operations in the area include Adobe, Amazon, Citrix Systems, Dell, Huawei, Lexmark, LG, Microsoft, Novell, Nvidia, O2, Oracle, Panasonic, SAP, and Symantec.

England 

The eastern end of the English M4 corridor is home to a large number of technology companies, particularly in Berkshire, Swindon and the Thames Valley. For this reason this part of the M4 corridor is sometimes described as England's "Silicon Valley". Slough, Windsor, Maidenhead, Reading, Bracknell and Newbury are the main towns in the Berkshire stretch of the M4.

Reading is home to many information technology and financial services businesses, including Cisco, Microsoft, ING Direct, Oracle, Prudential, Yell Group and Ericsson. Vodafone has a major corporate campus in Newbury, O2 plc is in Slough. Maidenhead is the home of Hutchison 3G UK's headquarters and Tesla Motors' UK head office.

Investment has gradually spread westwards since the 1980s. In the west, the interchange of the M4 and M5 motorways north of Bristol had seen considerable growth of industries by the mid 1990s.

Wales

The major Welsh towns and cities along the M4 corridor are Bridgend, Cardiff, Llanelli, Neath, Newport, Port Talbot and Swansea. South Wales is an industrial heartland of the UK.

The 1980s and 1990s saw the development of the Swansea Enterprise Park. The Celtic Manor Resort, adjacent to the M4 in Newport, has received significant investment and hosted the 2010 Ryder Cup. Newport has seen significant growth in the electronics industry since the late 1980s. The 1990s saw significant investment in Cardiff, such as in Cardiff Gate and the Cardiff Bay area. One site of note on the M4 corridor is Port Talbot Steelworks – the largest steel producer in the UK and one of the biggest in Europe.

The opening of the Second Severn Crossing in 1996 resulted in the previous M4 and bridge, serving Chepstow, being renumbered the M48, although the area is still generally considered as falling within the M4 corridor.

Since the start of the 21st century there has been evidence of more investment west of Cardiff, such as:
Port Talbot
Aberavon Beach
Baglan Industrial Park
Baglan Energy Park
 Amazon.co.uk fulfilment centre at Crymlyn Burrows
Swansea
Maritime Quarter
SA1 development
Swansea Vale
Felindre
Llanelli
Dafen/Llanelli Gate
Parc Hendre
Parc Trostre and Parc Pemberton
Llanelli Waterside, including North Dock and Delta Lakes
Ffos Las racecourse
Cross Hands
Cross Hands Food Park
Cross Hands Business Park

See also
Great Western Cities
Silicon Fen
Silicon Glen
Silicon Gorge

References

External links
The Guardian: Advantages of the M4 corridor as a business location

Economy of England
Economy of Wales
High-technology business districts in the United Kingdom
Information technology places
M4 motorway
Regions of England
Regions of Wales
Science and technology in Berkshire
South East England